Sibling Rivalry is a 1990 black comedy film directed by Carl Reiner and starring Kirstie Alley, Sam Elliott, Jami Gertz, Bill Pullman, Carrie Fisher, and Scott Bakula.

Plot
Marjorie Turner has been married for eight years and is tired of her husband Harry's neglect and his snooty relatives, most of them doctors. One day her sister, Jeanine, urges her to break out of her rut and have a fling.

At a grocery store, Marjorie allows herself to be picked up for a quick sexual tryst. Unfortunately, her lover dies during the act. Even more unfortunately, the dead man turns out to be Harry's long-absent brother Charles.

Complications ensue, some of them involving a vertical blinds salesman named Nick. He was in the hallway, wanting to get into a room to install blinds so he could convince the hotel to invest in them.

When Marjorie leaves the room, she inadvertently both drops her wallet and leaves the door ajar. Thinking he's in luck, Nick gets to work hanging the blinds. Halfway through a pole slips, hitting the lifeless man in the bed. Feeling responsible for the man's death, he calls Marjorie as he assumes she's his wife.

Marjorie goes to the hotel room to get her wallet back, and she and Nick panic, so they decide to make it look like a suicide. She writes a suicide note, and they empty bottles of pills down his throat. From home, she calls 911 to report the death. 

When police arrive, Nick is in the room and insists it must have been a prank. His brother Wilbur is a police officer investigating the case. He meets Jeanine while investigating the 911 call. They have chemistry and become involved. 

The autopsy reveals the non-lethal pills in Charles's esophagus as well as possible evidence of cardiac arrest. In the meantime, Nick has confessed to accidentally hitting Charles in the head with the blind hardware. Calling a family meeting, Harry fills them in on the investigation, Jeanine bursts in, telling Marjorie about Nick protecting her  by confessing.

Marjorie comes clean in front of everyone, and when Harry's family hears they attack her. He tells them to get out. Shortly after, he both leaves the practice and moves away. 

Months later, things are looking up for the siblings. Nick finally becomes successful selling blinds, Wilbur has become police chief and Jeanine moves in with him. Marjorie gets the story about her, Harry and Charles published and Harry comes back after having opened his own practice to start over.

Cast
 Kirstie Alley as Marjorie Turner
 Jami Gertz as Jeanine, Marjorie's sister
 Bill Pullman as Nicholas Meany
 Ed O'Neill as Wilbur Meany, Nicholas's brother
 Carrie Fisher as Iris Turner-Hunter, Harry's sister
 Scott Bakula as Harry Turner, Marjorie's husband
 Frances Sternhagen as Rose Turner, Harry's mother
 John Randolph as Charles Turner, Sr., Harry's father
 Sam Elliott as Charles Turner, Jr., Harry's brother

Production
Principal photography began on April 16, 1990, and ended on June 21, 1990. Filming took place in and Los Angeles & Marin County, California. Interior scenes were filmed on set at Warner Bros Studios.

Release
Sibling Rivalry was released on October 26, 1990 in 1,448 theatres. It opened at #2 at the box office, grossing $4 million in its opening weekend. It stayed at #2 in its second weekend grossing $8.424.402. After three months in theatres, the film went on to gross $17,854,933 in its theatrical run.

Reception
The film received negative reviews from critics and has a 25% rating on Rotten Tomatoes from 12 reviews.

References

External links
 
 
 
 

1990 films
1990s black comedy films
American black comedy films
Castle Rock Entertainment films
Columbia Pictures films
1990s English-language films
Films about siblings
Films directed by Carl Reiner
Films scored by Jack Elliott
Films shot in California
Films shot in Los Angeles
1990 comedy films
1990s American films